Las Lagunas may refer to the following places:

 Las Lagunas, San Luis, in San Luis province, Argentina
 , a locality in Sarmiento Department, San Juan, Argentina
 Las Lagunas, a district of Moca, Dominican Republic
 Las Lagunas, a district of Padre Las Casas, Dominican Republic
 , an area in Mijas, Spain

See also
Lagunas (disambiguation)